The 20th CBRNE Command (Chemical, Biological, Radiological, Nuclear and high- yield Explosives or CBRNE) is the United States Army's Chemical, Biological, Nuclear, Radiological and high-yield explosives headquarters.

Command Overview 
The 20th CBRNE Command (CBRNE—Chemical, Biological, Radiological, Nuclear and Explosives), also called CBRNE Command, was activated 16 Oct. 2004, by U.S. Army Forces Command to provide specialized CBRNE response in support of military operations and civil authorities.

The U.S. Army Forces analyzed threats facing the US in both domestic and international contexts, and argued for the need to realign and expand the Army's CBRNE assets and capabilities. The CBRNE Command consolidates its unique assets under a single operational headquarters located in the Edgewood Area of Aberdeen Proving Ground, Maryland.

CBRNE operations detect, identify, assess, render-safe, dismantle, transfer, and dispose of unexploded ordnance, improvised explosive devices and other CBRNE hazards. These operations also include decontaminating personnel and property exposed to CBRNE materials during response.

By consolidating these assets under one headquarters, the Army has more effective command and control of its specialized CBRNE elements. This alignment also eliminates operational redundancies and allows more efficient management and employment of these unique—but limited—resources.

The 20th CBRNE Command gives the Army and the nation a scalable response capability with the flexibility to operate in a variety of environments, from urban areas to austere sites across the spectrum of military operations. Subordinate elements include the 48th Chemical Brigade, the 52d Ordnance Group (Explosive Ordnance Disposal), the 71st Ordnance Group (EOD) and the CBRNE Analytical and Remediation Activity, known as CARA. These organizations support Combatant Commands and the Homeland in operations and contingencies throughout the world. At any time, 20 percent of the command is deployed in support of Operation Enduring Freedom in Afghanistan.

When called upon, the command may deploy and serve as a headquarters for the Joint Task Force for Elimination of Weapons of Mass Destruction (JTF-E), as directed by the 2006 Quadrennial Defense Review.

The CBRNE Command leverages sanctuary reach back, linking subject matter experts in America's defense, scientific and technological communities with deployed elements and first responders.

When fully operational, the command will possess a deployable chemical and biological analytical capability to provide timely, accurate analysis of unknown samples and a near real-time chemical-/biological- monitoring platform. This minimizes risk to on-scene personnel and affords leaders timely information to issue guidance and make decisions.

Current structure 

 20th CBRNE Command Structure, Aberdeen Proving Ground (MD)
 48th Chemical Brigade, Fort Hood (TX)
 52nd Ordnance Group (EOD), Fort Campbell (KY)
 71st Ordnance Group (EOD), Fort Carson (CO)
 CBRNE Analytical and Remediation Activity-East (CARA), Aberdeen Proving Ground (MD)
 CBRNE Analytical and Remediation Activity-West (CARA), Redstone Arsenal (AL)

Training Readiness Authority:
 Consequence Management Unit (CMU) (Army Reserve), Aberdeen Proving Ground (MD)

History 
On 16 October 2004 the 20th CBRNE Command was activated at Aberdeen Proving Ground, Md., as a major subordinate command under US Army Forces Command with the mission of providing an operational headquarters to command and control Army CBRNE operations and serve as the primary Army force provider of specialized CBRNE capabilities.

Assigned to the new headquarters were the 52d EOD Group and its five EOD battalions, and the 22d Chemical Battalion (Technical Escort), formerly known as the Technical Escort Unit. In June 2005, the 71st EOD Group was activated at Fort Carson, Colo. By June 2006, three new EOD battalions were assigned to the 71st EOD Group and the 110th Chemical Battalion (TE) was activated at Ft. Lewis, Wash.

The publishing of the 2006 Quadrennial Defense Review required further alterations to the 20th Support Command’s structure, organization, manning and equipment in order to meet its new requirement to stand-up and serve as the headquarters for the Joint Task Force for Elimination of WMD (JTF-E).

In May 2007, the establishment of the CBRNE Analytical and Remediation Activity (CARA) with four remediation response teams, multiple mobile exploitation laboratories, and an aviation section, marked a key milestone in the Command’s ability to provide the Army with the full spectrum of specialized CBRNE forces and capabilities.

In September 2007, the final major organizational piece was completed when the 48th Chemical Brigade was activated and assumed command of three Chemical Battalions and the two Chemical Technical Escort Battalions.

In addition to the Command’s organic assets the 20th CBRNE Command assumed operational control of the USAR Consequence Management Unit in 2008 and administrative control of the 1st and 9th Area Medical Laboratories.

The CBRNE Command also executes command and control of five WMD-Coordination Elements that deploy to augment combatant commanders or lead federal agencies with their significant CBRNE and combating-WMD expertise and communications assets. The Command’s four Nuclear Disablement Teams provide the final piece of the puzzle and the Command’s ability to execute full-spectrum counter-CBRNE and combating-WMD operations at home and abroad.

In 2008, elements of the Command deployed in support of Operation Iraqi Freedom for sensitive missions leveraging the unique capabilities of this command. The CBRNE Command has deployed over 20 units and headquarters per year in support of OIF and OEF for counter-IED operations, and CBRN force protection, exploitation, and elimination operations and at any time more than 20 percent of the Command is deployed abroad in support of OIF and OEF.

The command maintains a robust rapid response force for threats in the homeland, and routinely supports the President, other dignitaries, and national special security events. The command now stands with two EOD Groups, one Chemical Brigade, 12 Battalions, more than 65 Companies, and one direct reporting activity. The 20th CBRNE Command continues to transform to meet current and future challenges at home and abroad.

"Liberty We Defend"

Training 
The CBRNE Command also trains foreign governments in CBRN detection and response. The Command trained the Armed Forces of the Philippines at Camp Aguinaldo in 2014. During the training, vehicles carrying explosives were prepared as a test scenario. The AFP bomb squad defused the simulated explosives and the CBRNE Command neutralized the chemical threat. In another exercise, the U.S. Army trained the Kenya Rapid Deployment Capability to respond to HAZMAT/CBRN incidents using SCBA gear.

Commanders 
 BG Walter L. Davis (October 2004–August 2005)
 BG Kevin R. Wendel (September 2005–June 2008)
 BG Jeffrey J. Snow (June 2008–May 2010)
 MG Leslie C. Smith (July 2010–May 2013)
 BG JB Burton (May 2013–May 2015)
 BG William E. King IV (May 2015–July 2017)
 BG James E. Bonner (July 2017–June 2020)
 MG Antonio V. Munera (June 2020-September 2022)
 BG Daryl O. Hood (September 2022-present)

Deputy Commanders 
 COL Gene King
 COL Paul Plemmons
 COL Raymond Van Pelt
 COL Thomas Langowski
 COL Kyle Nordmeyer
 COL. Marty Muchow

Command Sergeants Major 
 CSM Marvin Womack, Sr., 2005 to 2009
 CSM Ronald E. Orosz, 2009 to 2011
 CSM David Puig, 2012 to 2014
 CSM Harold E. Dunn IV, 2014 to 2016
 CSM Kenneth M. Graham, 2016 to 2018
 CSM Henney M. Hodgkins 2018 to 2021
 CSM Jorge Arzabala Jr. 2021 to 2023
 CSM David Silva, 2023 to Present

See also 
Bioterrorism

References

Further reading 
 Ben Sheppard, 'Chemical reactions,' Jane's Defence Weekly, 4 February 2009, p. 28–31

External links 
 20th CBRNE Command Home Page  – Official Site
 News on the 20th annual competition
 CBRNE response team from 20th CBRN deal with washed up munitions

Support Commands of the United States Army
Chemical units and formations of the United States Army